Phyllonorycter stettinensis is a moth of the family Gracillariidae. It is found from Scandinavia and Finland to the Pyrenees, Corsica, Italy and Bulgaria and from Great Britain to Russia.

The wingspan is 6.5-7.5 mm. There are two generations per year with adults on wing in May and again in August.

The larvae feed on Alnus cordata, Alnus glutinosa and Alnus incana, mining the leaves of their host plant. They create an upper-surface, fairly small, almost flat tentiform mine with a yellow-green colour. The mine has a single, fairly strong fold and is mostly positioned over a lateral vein. The frass is deposited in a clump in a corner of the mine.

References

stettinensis
Moths described in 1852
Moths of Asia
Moths of Europe